A guandao is a type of Chinese pole weapon that is used in some forms of Chinese martial arts. In Chinese, it is properly called a yanyuedao (偃月刀; lit. "reclining moon blade"), the name under which it always appears in texts from the Song to Qing dynasties such as the Wujing Zongyao and Huangchao Liqi Tushi. It is comparable to the Japanese naginata and the European fauchard or glaive and consists of a heavy blade with a spike at the back and sometimes also a notch at the spike's upper base that can catch an opponent's weapon.  In addition there are often irregular serrations that lead the back edge of the blade to the spike. The blade is mounted atop a 1.5 m to 1.8 m (5–6 foot) long wooden or metal pole with a pointed metal counter weight used to balance the heavy blade and for striking on the opposite end.

On modern versions, a red sash or tassel is attached at the joint of the pole and blade. Variations include having rings along the length of the straight back edge as found in the nine-ring guandao, having the tip curl into a rounded spiral as in the elephant guandao, or featuring a more ornate design as exemplified by the dragon head guandao. However, apart from the "elephant guandao" none of these variations seem to have historical ground.

History

According to legend, the guandao was invented by the famous general Guan Yu during the early 3rd century AD, hence the name. It is said that he specified its form and size to be made by a smithy, and was uniquely able to wield such an imposing weapon due to his large stature and legendary strength. Guan Yu's guandao was called "Green Dragon Crescent Blade" (青龍偃月刀, Qīnglóng yǎnyuèdāo) which weighed 82 Chinese jin (estimated either at 18.263 kg or 48.38 kg—a Han Dynasty jin was 222.72 grams in the metric system, while the jin used in the Ming Dynasty—during which the Romance of the Three Kingdoms was written—was about 590 grams).

However, while the famous novel Romance of the Three Kingdoms by Luo Guanzhong describes him as wielding the guandao, this description may have been an anachronistic one intended to make the character seem more imposing:  historically speaking there was no evidence to show that Guan Yu used the weapon that is thus attributed to him, and indeed there is no indication of the existence of what is now known as the guandao prior to the 11th century, when it was first illustrated in the military manual Wujing Zongyao. The guandao, therefore, possibly did not even exist during Guan Yu's era, meaning that it could be somewhat of a pop culture-derived misnomer.  Furthermore, the scholar Tao Hongjing (456-536 AD) recorded in the Gujin Daojianlu (古今刀劍錄, "A Catalogue of Ancient and Modern Sabers and Rapiers") that Guan Yu forged a pair of sabres using iron ore he harvested from Wudushan mountain (武都山) himself, which may have inspired the story that Guan Yu invented his weapon.  However, this would also indicate that he did not use a guandao or even anything resembling a guandao, since the pole-mounted or long handled dao weapons such as the pudao or dadao were all wielded with two hands and so would not have been made or used in a pair.

While some historians still contend that the guandao was simply an uncommon weapon prior to the Tang dynasty and was thus not illustrated before then, historical evidence leans towards the attribution being an instance of creative license. By the time of Qing Dynasty the guandao, for the most part, was not actually intended for field use, but was instead used as a tool to test the strength of those who wished to become military officers: weapons of various weights were made, the test composed simply of performing various required maneuvers using such weapons.  During the Qing dynasty some extraordinarily heavy versions of guandao were made for this purpose: a candidate had to be able to wield a weapon weighing 80, 100, or 120 jin (48, 60 or 72 kg, using the modern value for 1 jin = approximately .6 kg), with weapons of each weight being successively higher grades in the exam, the passage of which led to appointment as military officers of various ranks based on the grade. The heaviest known "testing guandao", which resides in a museum at Shanhaiguan, weighs 83 kilograms.  While the examples are taken from the Qing dynasty and therefore may have been influenced by the book (which was written in the Ming dynasty), military officer tests (which began in the Tang dynasty) have always involved lifting heavy stones of standardized weight and maneuvering them about, possibly contributing to the writer's decision to assign an unusual weight to Guan Yu's weapon.

The weapon was also widely adopted by martial artists for the purposes of training and for demonstrating their strength, perhaps also to train specifically for the military officer's tests. Where it was used, it was largely used by infantry.  In the Qing Dynasty, it was used by the all Han Green Standard Army. Apart from that, the lack of standardization of the antique examples that survive to today seems to indicate that at least from the 19th century onwards it was popular in the civilian martial arts realm as well.

The modern guandao as adopted by martial artists today usually weighs between 2 kg and 10 kg (5 and 20 pounds), and is typically composed of a wood shaft of about three to five feet in length, a short blade of about 12 to 18 inches on one end, and a mace head on the other (which serves mostly as a counterweight to the blade but can also be used for striking), the whole assembly rarely exceeding five to six feet in total length.  The greatly reduced weight and length reflects its nature as a more practical form for martial artists.

Combat uses

The guandao is used quite frequently in the martial art of contemporary Wushu derived from the Shaolin or Wudangquan form of martial arts in modern times. According to contemporary Wushu practice, its purpose is more to disarm an opponent and deflect his strikes rather than to attack. To that end, a large veil cloth is attached to the end to dissuade and confuse opponents. However, there is no evidence of this being an authentic depiction of the weapon's historical usage. Tassels and cloths are attached to numerous weapons such as jian, dao, meteor hammer, and guandao used in Chinese opera, one of the sources of movements found in contemporary wushu.

Forms utilizing the weapon in nearly all traditional styles of Chinese martial arts emphasize strong slashing movements and momentum to keep the heavy blade moving through a series of spinning cuts. The considerable weight of the weapon also makes guandao forms good for training the overall conditioning of the body.

Similar weapons were also used in Southeast Asia. They were famously used by royals to fight each other on elephant back.

Extremely unusually for historical weapons, the Guandao is reportedly still used today. Chinese soldiers armed with Guandaos and modern combat uniforms were photographed near the Line of Actual Control with India, where a 1996 agreement between India and China prohibits firearm usage.

Popular culture
 In Avatar: The Last Airbender, a guandao was used by Kach, a member of the Rough Rhinos.
 In The Legend of Korra, guandaos were used by the Chuu Brothers.
 Power Rangers Jungle Fury features Carnisoar, the Sky Overlord with the Spirit of the Hawk, using a double-bladed guandao.
 In the series Yona of the Dawn, the character Hak uses a guandao.
 In the video game For Honor, the character Jiang Jun wields a guandao.
 In the video game Warframe, the Guandao and Guandao prime are a type of polearm which you can craft.
 Dynasty Warriors features Guan Yu wielding a guandao.
In  Kingdom (manga), General Ouki use as main weapon a guando, he manage to give it to the main character Shin. There is many other references to this kind of weapons

See also
 Pudao
 Dadao
 Woldo
 Glaive
 Halberd
 Naginata
 Bisento

References

 
 Wong Kiew Kit, The art of shaolin kung fu: the secrets of kung fu for self-defense health and enlightenment Tuttle martial arts, Tuttle Publishing 2002, .
 Yang Jwing-Ming [e] Jwing-Ming Yang, Ancient Chinese weapons: a martial artist's guide, YMAA Publication Center Inc. 1999, .

External links 
 

Blade weapons
Chinese martial arts terminology
Chinese melee weapons
Chinese swords
Polearms
Weapons of China